Treubach is a municipality in the district of Braunau am Inn in the Austrian state of Upper Austria.

Geography
Treubach lies in the Innviertel. About 17 percent of the municipality is forest and 76 percent farmland.

References

Cities and towns in Braunau am Inn District